Wiktorów may refer to the following places:
Wiktorów, Wieluń County in Łódź Voivodeship (central Poland)
Wiktorów, Zduńska Wola County in Łódź Voivodeship (central Poland)
Wiktorów, Zgierz County in Łódź Voivodeship (central Poland)
Wiktorów, Warsaw West County in Masovian Voivodeship (east-central Poland)
Wiktorów, Wołomin County in Masovian Voivodeship (east-central Poland)